in Nachikatsuura, Wakayama Prefecture, Japan, is one of the best-known waterfalls in Japan. With a drop of 133 meters (and 13 meters wide), it is the country's tallest water fall with single uninterrupted drop; however, the tallest waterfalls with multiple drops in Japan are Hannoki Falls, at 497 m (seasonal), and Shōmyō Falls, at 350m (year round).

There are two rocks at the top of the falls that are the guardian kami of the falls and the Shinto shrine. There was also a Buddhist temple here that was destroyed during the Meiji Restoration (late 19th century). Many shugenja and star-crossed lovers have leaped from the top of the waterfall in the belief that they will be reborn into Kannon's paradise. Early each morning the Shinto priest make offerings to the waterfall in a ritual. In 1918, a Sutra mound was excavated at the base of the waterfall and found to contain many important archaeological artifacts, including statues, mirrors, altar fittings and Sutra cylinders. These are now displayed in the Ryuhoden (“Treasure Hall”), located next to the Sanjūdō Pagoda (the 3-story pagoda). These Sutra mounds were created by priests in times of war to hide their treasures but also many items were buried in this way as a result of the belief that the end of the world was coming at the start of the 10th century.

Believed to house a kami called Hiryū Gongen worshiped at Kumano Nachi Taisha, it is part of the "Sacred Sites and Pilgrimage Routes in the Kii Mountain Range" UNESCO World Heritage Site.

See also

Tourism in Japan

References

External links
 Japan Guide
 Tanabe City Kumano Tourism Bureau
 Nachi-Katsuura Town Tourism Association

Waterfalls of Japan
Places of Scenic Beauty
Landforms of Wakayama Prefecture
Tourist attractions in Wakayama Prefecture
Kumano Sanzan